Events from the year 1499 in France

Incumbents
 Monarch – Louis XII

Events

 January 8 – Louis XII of France marries Anne of Brittany, in accordance with a law set by his predecessor, Charles VIII.
 February 9 – Treaty of Blois signed between France and Venice. This would lead to the Second Italian War
 October 6 – Louis XII enters Milan
 October 25 – The Pont Notre-Dame in Paris, constructed under Charles VI of France, collapses into the Seine.
 November 5 – The Catholicon is published in Tréguier (Brittany). This Breton–French–Latin dictionary had been written in 1464 by Jehan Lagadeuc. It is the first dictionary of either French or Breton.

Births

Full date missing
Claude of France, queen consort (died 1524)
Diane de Poitiers, noblewoman (died 1566)
Gentian Hervetus, theologian, humanist and controversialist (died 1584)

Deaths

Full date missing
Jean Bilhères de Lagraulas, abbot, bishop and cardinal

See also

References

1490s in France